Juan Pablo Miño Peña (born 23 August 1987) is an Argentine naturalized Chilean footballer. His current club is Torneo Federal A side Douglas Haig.

Career
After playing for Deportes Iquique until 2022, Miño returned to his country of birth and joined Douglas Haig in the Torneo Federal A.

Personal life
Miño naturalized Chilean by residence.

Honours
San Luis de Quillota
 Primera B (1): 2009 Apertura

Cobresal
 Primera División de Chile (1): 2015 Clausura

References

External links
 
 

1987 births
Living people
Footballers from Rosario, Santa Fe
Argentine footballers
Argentine expatriate footballers
Naturalized citizens of Chile
Chilean footballers
Chilean expatriate footballers
Primera B Metropolitana players
Central Córdoba de Rosario footballers
Chilean Primera División players
Primera B de Chile players
San Luis de Quillota footballers
C.D. Antofagasta footballers
Coquimbo Unido footballers
Cobresal footballers
Audax Italiano footballers
Deportes Iquique footballers
Santiago Wanderers footballers
Torneo Federal A players
Club Atlético Douglas Haig players
Argentine expatriate sportspeople in Chile
Expatriate footballers in Chile
Association football midfielders